Eggeling is a Germanic surname. It may refer to:

Dale Eggeling (born 1954), U.S. golfer
Frank Eggeling (born 1963) German footballer
(Hans) Julius Eggeling (1842–1918), Scottish Professor of Sanskrit, translator, and editor
Heinz-Werner Eggeling (born 1955), German footballer
Joachim Albrecht Eggeling (1884–1945)m German Nazi SS officer
Viking Eggeling (1880–1925), Swedish avant-garde artist and filmmaker
William Julius Eggeling (1909–1994), Scottish forester, botanist and naturalist